Multi-scale camouflage is a type of military camouflage combining patterns at two or more scales, often (though not necessarily) with a digital camouflage pattern created with computer assistance. The function is to provide camouflage over a range of distances, or equivalently over a range of scales (scale-invariant camouflage), in the manner of fractals, so some approaches are called fractal camouflage. Not all multiscale patterns are composed of rectangular pixels, even if they were designed using a computer. Further, not all pixellated patterns work at different scales, so being pixellated or digital does not of itself guarantee improved performance.

The first standardized pattern to be issued was the single-scale Italian telo mimetico. The root of the modern multi-scale camouflage patterns can be traced back to 1930s experiments in Europe for the German and Soviet armies. This was followed by the Canadian development of the Canadian Disruptive Pattern (CADPAT), first issued in 2002, and then with US work which created the Marine pattern (MARPAT), launched between 2002 and 2004.

Principle

Scale invariance
The scale of camouflage patterns is related to their function. Large structures need larger patterns than individual soldiers to disrupt their shape. At the same time, large patterns are more effective from afar, while small scale patterns work better up close. Traditional single scale patterns work well in their optimal range from the observer, but an observer at other distances will not see the pattern optimally. Nature itself is very often fractal, where plants and rock formations exhibit similar patterns across several magnitudes of scale. The idea behind multi-scale patterns is both to mimic the self-similarity of nature, and also to offer scale invariant or so-called fractal camouflage.

Animals such as the flounder have the ability to adapt their camouflage patterns to suit the background, and they do so extremely effectively, selecting patterns that match the spatial scales of the current background.

Design trade-offs

When a pattern is called digital, this most often means that it is visibly composed of computer-generated pixels. The term is sometimes also used of computer generated patterns like the non-pixellated MultiCam and the Italian fractal Vegetato pattern. Neither pixellation nor digitization contribute to the camouflaging effect. The pixellated style, however, simplifies design and eases printing on fabric, compared to traditional patterns. While digital patterns are becoming widespread, critics maintain that the pixellated look is a question of fashion rather than function.

The design process involves trading-off different factors, including colour, contrast and overall disruptive effect. A failure to consider all elements of pattern design tends to result in poor results. The US Army's Universal Camouflage Pattern (UCP), for example, adopted after limited testing in 2003–4, performed poorly because of low pattern contrast ("isoluminance"—beyond very close range, the design looks like a field of solid light grey, failing to disrupt an object's outlines) and arbitrary colour selection, neither of which could be saved by quantizing (digitizing) the pattern geometry. The design was replaced from 2015 with Operational Camouflage Pattern, a non-pixellated pattern.

History

Interwar development in Europe

The idea of patterned camouflage extends back to the interwar period in Europe. The first printed camouflage pattern was the 1929 Italian telo mimetico, which used irregular areas of three colours at a single scale.

German WWII experiments

During the Second World War, Johann Georg Otto Schick designed a series of patterns such as Platanenmuster (plane tree pattern) and Erbsenmuster (pea-dot pattern) for the Waffen-SS, combining micro- and macro-patterns in one scheme.

The German Army developed the idea further in the 1970s into Flecktarn, which combines smaller shapes with dithering; this softens the edges of the large scale pattern, making the underlying objects harder to discern.

Soviet WWII experiments

Pixel-like shapes pre-date computer-aided design by many years, already being used in Soviet Union experiments with camouflage patterns, such as "TTsMKK" developed in 1944 or 1945. The pattern uses areas of olive green, sand, and black running together in broken patches at a range of scales.

1976 research by Timothy O'Neill

In 1976, Timothy O'Neill created a pixellated pattern named "Dual-Tex". He called the digital approach "texture match". The initial work was done by hand on a retired M113 armoured personnel carrier; O'Neill painted the pattern on with a 2-inch (5 centimetres) roller, forming squares of colour by hand. Field testing showed that the result was good compared to the U. S. Army's existing camouflage patterns, and O'Neill went on to become an instructor and camouflage researcher at West Point military academy.

2000s fractal-like digital patterns

By 2000, development was underway to create pixellated camouflage patterns for battledress like the Canadian Forces' CADPAT, that was developed in 1997 which later was issued in 2002, and then the US Marines' MARPAT, rolled out between 2002 and 2004. The CADPAT and MARPAT patterns were somewhat self-similar (in the manner of fractals and patterns in nature such as vegetation), is designed to work at two different scales; a genuinely fractal pattern would be statistically similar at all scales. A target camouflaged with MARPAT takes about 2.5 times longer to detect than older NATO camouflage which worked at only one scale, while recognition, which begins after detection, took 20 percent longer than with older camouflage.

Fractal-like patterns work because the human visual system efficiently discriminates images that have different fractal dimension or other second-order statistics like Fourier spatial amplitude spectra; objects simply appear to pop out from the background. Timothy O'Neill helped the Marine Corps to develop first a digital pattern for vehicles, then fabric for uniforms, which had two colour schemes, one designed for woodland, one for desert.

Notes

References

Camouflage
Military camouflage
Military technology
Camouflage patterns